Dubois, DuBois, or Du Bois may refer to:

People
 W. E. B. Du Bois, American sociologist

Places

United States
 Mount Dubois, California
 Dubois, Idaho
 Du Bois, Illinois
 Dubois, Indiana
 Dubois County, Indiana
 Du Bois, Nebraska
 DuBois, Pennsylvania
 Dubois, Wyoming

Others
 Dubois (surname), a Norman-French surname (include a list of people with the surnames Dubois and Du Bois)
 206241 Dubois, an asteroid

See also 
 DuBose (disambiguation) (and thereby Dubose)